Grishuneva is a rural locality (a village) in Verkh-Invenskoye Rural Settlement, Kudymkarsky District, Perm Krai, Russia. The population was 72 as of 2010. There are 3 streets.

Geography 
Grishuneva is located 22 km southwest of Kudymkar (the district's administrative centre) by road. Gyrova is the nearest rural locality.

References 

Rural localities in Kudymkarsky District